Borys Mykolayovych Martos (Ukrainian: Борис Миколайович Мартос) (May 20, 1879 – September 19, 1977) was a Ukrainian politician, pedagogue, and economist.

Biography 
Martos was born in Hradyzk, Poltava Governorate, Russian Empire) into noble family of Ossorya coat of arms.

Martos graduated from Lubny Classic gymnasium in 1897 and enrolled into the Mathematics Department of the Kharkiv University. There Martos became a member of a secret Ukrainian student hromada of Kharkiv. Here in 1900 in Kharkiv he met with Symon Petliura and his future wife M. Kucheryavenko. In the summer of 1900 Martos participated in the First Ukrainian Student Congress in Halychyna.

He was arrested three times for collaboration with the Revolutionary Ukrainian Party. After graduating and until 1917 Martos worked in several different places: a co-ed in Volhynia, a financial director at the Black Sea-Kuban Railway board, a director of the Kuban Cooperative Bank, and a cooperative instructor for the Poltava Governorate zemstvo (1913–1917). In 1917 Martos served on numerous official positions as delegate in the Central Rada and its Executive Committee (Mala Rada), and the General Secretariat. After the Hetman coup-d'etat worked as a cooperator. During that time Martos was heading the Central Ukrainian Cooperative Committee as its executive director as well working at the board of directors for the Dniprosoyuz, giving lectures at the Kyiv Commercial Institute, and had established the Kyiv Cooperative Institute.

Under the Directorate of Ukraine, he served as the chairman of the Council of People's Ministers of the Ukrainian People's Republic from April 9, to August 27, 1919. In 1917-1918 Martos was a member of the Central Rada and the Secretary of Agrarian Affairs. In 1918 he also was heading the All-Ukrainian Cooperative Committee.

In 1920 Martos emigrated to Czechoslovakia, where he used to teach in the Ukrainian management Academy in Prague. He died on 19 September 1977, and is buried in New Jersey, United States.

References

External links
Borys Martos at Encyclopedia of Ukraine.com 
Biography at the government portal of Ukraine 

1879 births
1977 deaths
People from Poltava Oblast
People from Kremenchugsky Uyezd
Ukrainian people in the Russian Empire
Hromada (society) members
Prime ministers of the Ukrainian People's Republic
Ukrainian Social Democratic Labour Party politicians
Members of the Shevchenko Scientific Society
Food provision ministers of Ukraine
Land cultivation ministers of Ukraine
Members of the Central Council of Ukraine
National University of Kharkiv alumni
Finance ministers of Ukraine
Soviet emigrants to Czechoslovakia
Czechoslovak emigrants to the United States
Burials at Ukrainian Orthodox Church Cemetery, South Bound Brook